Philopoemen Constantinidi  (born Konstantinidis; ; 1909–1992) was a Greek painter and engraver.

Biography
Born in Thessaloniki, Salonica Vilayet, Ottoman Empire, Constantinidi studied at the Athens School of Fine Arts and in 1929 he entered the Académie de la Grande Chaumière in Paris.

In 1932, he exhibited at the Salon des Tuileries in Paris.

In 1953, he took part in an exhibition of his works in Thessaloniki.

He also participated in the exhibition of 1962, Greek painter and sculptor in Paris.

He wrote many articles for several art magazines in particular in the Cahiers d'Art by Christian Zervos. 
In 1930, he began painting under the influence of Paul Cézanne, Les Fauves and the Impressionists.

Then he painted abstract motives and later he returned to figuration.

In December 1997, his natal city and the Organism "Thessaloniki, European Cultural Capital" 
consecrates for him his first retrospective exposition.

Creations
Charchoune, Musée National d'Art Moderne, Centre Georges Pompidou, Paris.

Bibliography
Benezit, Dictionary of Artists.
Dizionario Universale delle Belle Arti Comanducci.

Documentary
The life of the artist, Philopoemen Constantinidi, 1997, Play Film, Paris.

References

1909 births
1992 deaths
Greek Macedonians
Artists from Thessaloniki
People from Salonica vilayet
Greeks from the Ottoman Empire
Date of birth missing
Date of death missing
20th-century Greek painters
Greek expatriates in France